Cycas orientis is a species of cycad, native to Australia's Northern Territory.

References

orientis
Flora of the Northern Territory
Plants described in 1994